Brankovo is a small settlement on the edge of the valley known as Mišja dolina (literally, 'Monks' valley'),  west of Velike Lašče in central Slovenia. The area is part of the traditional region of Lower Carniola and is now included in the Central Slovenia Statistical Region.

Name
Brankovo was attested in written sources as Frankchen in 1436 and Frankowicz in 1465. The name Brankovo is derived from an oeconym, referring to an isolated farm known as Branko that the village developed from.

References

External links
Brankovo on Geopedia

Populated places in the Municipality of Velike Lašče